Pierre Tombal is a Belgian gag comic strip, drawn by Marc Hardy and written by Raoul Cauvin, about a gravedigger and the dead people at his cemetery. The series has been in syndication since 1983 and is published in the Belgian magazine Spirou by Dupuis.

Synopsis

Pierre Tombal centers around an undertaker, Pierre Tombal (a pun on pierre tombale, gravestone in French), who owns a cemetery. He is able to talk to the dead people in his graveyard, which often freaks out visitors, especially when the corpses talk or react back. Pierre functions as a spokesperson, servant, aid and trustworthy guard on benefit of the people who are buried there. Many black comedy jokes are about the various ways his customers died or how they spent their daily lives at the graveyard. A running gag is Pierre's rivalry with the proprietor of a crematory and a captain who favors burial at sea. The Grim Reaper is also a recurring character.

Other languages
In Dutch the series is published under the name G. Raf Zerk. In Spanish as Pedro Tumbas. In Indonesian as Tombal.In Greek as Πιέρ το Κοράκι.

List of albums
 1 : Les 44 premiers trous, 1986.
 2 : Histoires d'os, 1986. 
 3 : Morts aux dents, 1987.
 4 : , 1987.
 5 : Ô suaires, 1988.
 6 : Côte à l'os, 1989.
 7 : Cas d'os surprise, 1990.
 8 : Trou dans la couche d'os jaunes, 1991.
 9 : Voyage de n'os, 1992.
 10 : Dégâts des os, 1993.
 11 : La défense des os primés, 1994.
 12 : Os Courent, 1995.
 13 : La pelle aux morts, 1996.
 14 : Des Décédés et des dés, 1997.
 15 : Chute d'os, 1997.
 16 : Tombe, la neige, 1998.
 17 : Devinez qui on enterre demain ?, 1999.
 18 : Condamné à perpète, 2000.
 19 : Squelettes en fête, 2001.
 20 : Morts de rire, 2002.
H.S. Best Of, Tome 1, 2003.
 21 : K.os, 2003.
 22 : Ne jouez pas avec la mort !, 2005.
 23 : Regrets éternels, 2006 (.
 24 : On s'éclate mortels, 2007.
 25 : Mise en orbite, 2008
 26 : Pompes funèbres, 2009.
 27 : Entre la vie et la mort, 2011.
 28 : L'amour est dans le cimetière, 2012.
 29 : Des os et des bas, 5 avril 2013.
 30 : Questions de vie ou de mort, 2014.
 31 : Peine de mort, 2015.
 32 : Fin de bail au cimetière, 2016.

References

External links
 Tombal.be Unofficial site of Marc Hardy
 la rédac de Tombal.be Fan site about the series.
 Pierre Tombal Official site of Marc Hardy. 
 Pierre Tombal at Krinein
 Pierre Tombal English version of official Dupuis page on the series.

Belgian comic strips
Belgian comics titles
Bandes dessinées
Dupuis titles
Tombal, Pierre
Tombal, Pierre
Tombal, Pierre
Tombal, Pierre
Tombal, Pierre
1983 comics debuts
Gag-a-day comics
Satirical comics
Tombal, Pierre
Black comedy comics
Fiction about funerals
Fiction about cemeteries
Comics about death
Comics set in Belgium
Comics about personifications of death